Jiuxian Township is a rural township in Dongping County, Shandong, China.

Administrative divisions
The township is divided into 30 villages: Jiuxian First Village, Jiuxian Second Village, Jiuxian Third Village, Jiuxian Fourth Village, Wanggudian First Village, Wanggudian Second Village, Wanggudian Third Village, Wanggudian Fourth Village, Wanggudian Fifth Village, Dajicheng First Village, Dajicheng Second Village, Dajicheng Third Village, Dajicheng Fourth Village, Dajicheng Fifth Village, Beijicheng Village, Chenshankou Village, Gaoxu Village, Shanwo Village, Fuliang Village, Zhaizi First Village, Zhaizi Second Village, Zhaizi Third Village, Yincun First Village, Yincun Second Village, Yincun Third Village, Jizhuang Village, Jianggou Village, Da'eshan Village, Dong'eshan Village, Tuncunpu Village, Jiuxian Village.

History
During the Spring and Autumn Period (771 BC–476 BC) and the Warring States Period (475 BC–221 BC), it was the seat of Yangguyi City. 

In the Qin dynasty (221 BC–206 BC), it belonged to Jibeijun.

In 202 B.C., Xiang Yu was defeated by Liu Bang, his head was buried here. 

In the Han dynasty (202 BC–220 AD), it was under the jurisdiction of Dongjun.

In the Northern Wei (386–535), it came under the jurisdiction of Jizhou.

In the Sui dynasty (581–618), it belonged to Jibeijun.

In the Tang dynasty (618–907), it came under the jurisdiction of Jizhou.

In the Northern Song dynasty (960–1127), it was under the jurisdiction of Dong'e County, and then under the jurisdiction of Dongpingfu in the Jin dynasty (1115–1234).

Since Yuan dynasty (1271–1368), it belonged to Dong'e County.

In 1938, one year after the Marco Polo Bridge Incident, it was occupied by the Imperial Japanese Army. Following Japan's surrender, it came under the jurisdiction of Pingyin County.

After the establishment of the Communist State in 1949, it was renamed Jiuxian People's Commune.

In May 1984, Jiuxian People's Commune was revoked and Jiuxian District was established.

On September 20, 1985, Jiuxian District was revoked and Jiuxian Township was established.

On January 23, 1996, it was under the jurisdiction of Dongping County.

Geography

Dongping Lake is the largest lake in the township.

Yellow River passes through the township west to east. Xiaoqing River flows south to north through the township.

Economy
Sweet potatoes, Vegetables and Fungus are important to the economy.

The principal industries in the area are apparel industry and sweet potato processing industry.

Transportation
National Highway G220 passes across the township.

Provincial Highway S255 is a provincial highway in the township.

Attractions
The main attractions are the Dongping Lake, Shijie Village Film and Television Base, Tomb of Xiang Yu, Site of Jiuxianyi, Site of Yangguyi City, Arch of Chastity and Filial Piety of Madame Qin, Mount Yanggu, and Bixia Ancestral Temple. 

During the ten-year Cultural Revolution, the Tomb of Xiang Yu was completely destroyed by the Red Guards. A 2000-year-old cypress of Han Dynasty was cut by the Red Guards.

References

Divisions of Dongping County